McCahey is a surname. Notable people with the surname include:

 Brendan McCahey (born 1976), Irish singer-songwriter
 Joe McCahey (1888–1917), American jockey
 Mike McCahey (born 1954), American fencer

See also
 McCarey